The Fallen is a fictional robot supervillain in the Transformers robot superhero franchise. According to Hasbro, he was formerly known as Megatronus, and was a multiversal singularity, meaning that while he exists across the multiverse, there is only one Megatronus. This is no longer the case because of an event called The Shrouding, where all multiversal singularities within the Hasbro-Takara multiversal now exist as separate beings within each universe. As explained in more detail in the appropriate sections below, the Fallen has been given different origin stories in several of the different continuities in which he has appeared. Although the Fallen's origins are only suggested in his comic book appearance, they would be fully explained in Dorling Kindersley's Transformers: The Ultimate Guide.

Megatronus was one of the original Thirteen Primes created by Primus and the founder of the Decepticons in many storylines and the catalyst that led Megatron to claim power for himself instead of the greater good. Originally he was depicted as having betrayed his creator by siding with Primus' dark twin, Unicron. In the final battle between Primus and Unicron, Megatronus fell victim to the same fate as his master, sucked through a black hole into another dimension. However, while Unicron emerged in another universe, the Fallen was not so fortunate, finding himself trapped in the "underspace" between dimensions. This origin has been altered or revised several times, even to the point that Primus and Unicron are removed entirely, even so, this is because he can jump through time and space, and hop dimensions, like the other Thirteen Primes.

Challenge of the GoBots
In the 1985 Challenge of the GoBots episode "Search for the Ancient Gobonauts", "the Evil One", is retroactively a version of Megatronus, according to "Ask Vector Prime". He nearly destroyed Gobotron with a device called the Dark Heart, only to wind up under the Nazca Lines on Earth. Centuries later, Cy-Kill goes on a quest to look for the ancient villain.

Transformers: Generation 1 continuities

Beast Wars
Years before the Fallen was introduced in the Generation 1 Dreamwave Productions comic book, Transformers: Beast Wars would introduce a similar character. This character was known simply "Megatron". Both the Generation 1 Megatron and Beast Era Megatron named themselves after this mythological figure. It is unknown if this Megatron named himself after him or if they are the same character, but all that is known about him is that he is "the beginning and the end" and "the alpha and omega", or at least claims to be as something of a God complex.

Dreamwave Productions
The Fallen made his first appearance in the second volume of Transformers: The War Within (2003). Around 6.5 million years ago, an accident in the "space bridge" system on Cybertron liberated the Fallen from his prison, and he materialized on Cybertron, where he quickly recruited the Chaos Trinity - Bludgeon, Mindwipe and Bugly - into his employ. Abducting Transformers that he identified as possessing "genetic potential" within their sparks - Grimlock, Blitzwing, Jetfire and Hot Spot - the Fallen planned to use their energies to awaken Primus from his self-imposed slumber, thereby alerting Unicron to his location, allowing the world-eater to renew hostilities with his old enemy. An attack from combined Autobot and Decepticon forces led by Shockwave and Prowl disrupted his plans, and Primus himself reached out and promptly destroyed the Fallen.

Fun Publications
The Fallen made an appearance in the story Vector Prime: In the Beginning published by Fun Publications. This issue shows many key points in previous Transformers stories from across the original comics, the original cartoon, Beast Wars, and the Armada television series. It establishes that there is one Unicron across the multiple continuities, and that Vector Prime travels through all of Transformers history. One of the silhouettes of the first 12 Transformers that stands behind Vector Prime in his first panel appears to be that of The Fallen. The later storyline "Another Light" saw Megatronus in an unlikely reunion with his fellow Primes, attempting to prevent Nexus Prime from creating firmer barriers between the various multiversal streams. This effort failed, and resulted in the Thirteen, Primus, and Unicron being split into separate beings with different personalities across the various dimensions. The "Ask Vector Prime" Facebook page also introduced other historical elements to Megatronus' character, such as him and his fellow Primes communicating with ancient Earth using holographic avatars that inspired the gods of Greek mythology, with Megatronus inspiring Ares.

IDW Publishing
Nexus Prime claimed that Megatronus, in collusion with Liege Maximo, began the First Cybertronian Civil War between the Thirteen and the tribes each Prime led. He broke a promise to Solus Prime and betrayed Prima. A notable figure in the war was Megatronus' former underling, Galvatron, who succeeded in killing Nexus Prime. In the end, the war forced eleven of the Thirteen to leave Cybertron, and Megatronus chose another planet to reside on. His location was later discovered by Shockwave, who seeded the planet with one of his Regenesis ores.

Prime Wars Trilogy

Dawn of the Universe and war between chaos and order 
Megatronus was one of the Thirteen Original Primes, the first Transformers created by Primus to battle together against the chaos bringer Unicron. Thanks to his love interest Solus Prime - who created a cosmic weapon called the Requiem Blaster capable of vanquishing Unicron - Megatronus was able to depower him, forcing him to temporarily but in a long-term period of time remain in stasis. As the Thirteen rested, Solus Prime was convinced that the Requiem Blaster should be destroyed, not to fall in wrong hands. On the other hand, Megatronus believed that the Blaster should be kept in order to assist the Primes in future sieges. The brief skirmish for possession of the Blaster resulted in its accidental activation, brutally murdering Solus and transforming her corpse into the Well of All Sparks. After the other Eleven considered this an unforgivable crime and banished Megatronus for that, they locked away the Requiem Blaster and built a tomb for Solus surrounded by a deep cave.

Deception 
Devastated, Megatronus gathered an army of followers which he named the Decepticons, inspired by his rage after losing his beloved one. From there, Megatronus set up a plan to recover Solus from the Well by draining the Sparks of all other sentient beings in the Universe. However, he was stopped by Prima, who idealized it would not be worth it to sacrifice billions of new Sparks for an ancient one. It is unknown which path Megatronus took after the showdown. Meanwhile, billions of years later, Megatronus's legacy was inherited by Megatron, who created the Decepticons as of his own vision for the planet Cybertron.

Major forces in play 
Later in the Earth-year 2018, after the Earth Wars between Autobots and Decepticons ended and Optimus Prime was resurrected and exiled with Megatron and a new High Council - Starscream, Rodimus Prime, and Mistress of Flame - took over the reborn Cybertron after Unicron's second defeat by the new Matrix-bearer Rodimus; Megatronus has sent the Prime artifact known as the Enigma of Combination to spark a flame to the Combiner Wars, followed by the Titan Wars. He has also collaborated with Overlord, who arrived in Unicron's corpse to claim the Matrix of Chaos. After the clash between Trypticon and Fortress Maximus was over, Megatronus arrived and - at the presence of the renegade Megatron, Windblade, Victorion and Perceptor - murdered Optimus Prime again and claimed the Matrix of Leadership and the Enigma as fundamental parts of his plot to revive Solus Prime in the Well with a machine of his own.

Power of the Primes 
Angered by Megatronus, Windblade, Megatron, Victorion and Perceptor travelled to a Swamp to claim the Requiem Blaster before him, coincidentally recruiting the Combiners Volcanicus, Predaking and the Requiem Blaster's current protector, Optimus Primal. However, Megatronus later arrived to claim back the Blaster as the team was weakened after a showdown with Overlord - who was seeking revenge against Megatron - and Rodimus Cron - a renegade Hot Rod possessed by Unicron after inheriting the Matrix of Chaos. With the Blaster, the Matrix and the Enigma in his possession, Megatronus teleported back to the Well of All Sparks to fuse the three artifacts in a machine that would use the Enigma to combine the essence of the Matrix with the power of the Blaster and drain every Cybertronian's Spark throughout the Universe, bringing the Transformers to their final days.

Just as Megatronus's machine was activated, the team arrived and damaged it, causing it to briefly go offline. Angered, Megatronus incapacitated all of the members but Megatron by paralyzing them with painful flames. And just as Megatronus is ready to finish his follower off for good, Rodimus Cron arrives and is completely assumed by Unicron, becoming the new overpowered entity known as Rodimus Unicronus, willing to destroy the Matrix of Leadership and the last remnants of his brother Primus within it, as well as destroying the last surviving Original Prime. As Megatronus and Unicron engaged in the closest showdown between Primus and Unicron ever since the dawn of the Universe, Optimus Primal was able to break Megatronus's machine once and for all with the assistance of Grimlock and Windblade and then he recovered the Matrix of Leadership. Enraged again by another nuisance to his plans, Megatronus attempted to stop Primal, but before this was possible he was able to open the Matrix for himself, becoming the new Matrix-bearer Optimal Optimus.

As the fight proceeded, Megatronus was seen fighting the rest of the team as Optimal should fend-off Rodimus Unicronus. When the worst moment came, as the Requiem Blaster was aimed to the team (and more specifically Megatron), Predaking arrived and was able to briefly immobilize Megatronus, later being unfortunately murdered by him as a consequence. During this time, Megatron negotiated with the fading-away figure of a resurrected Solus Prime to stop Megatronus, and during the same time the rest of the team was able to immobilize Rodimus and take the Matrix of Chaos out of his chest. When Solus accepted the deal - for she would not accept her beloved one could take any more lives - Megatronus was lured into the Well of All Sparks, instantly draining his lifeless body inside. It is known that Megatronus will resurrect in the future due to his immortality and his mutant Spark. However, this date is not predicted and could perhaps never arrive as Megatronus may have decided to stay in the Realm of All Sparks aside his beloved one and the rest of the Original Primes.

Legacy 
After the death of Megatronus Prime, Megatron has now completely given up his Decepticon tyrant life as he realized his way could perhaps not be the right, pending to sacrifice himself to stop Unicron from returning once again and banishing himself and Unicron's Anti-Spark (the Matrix of Chaos) to the Realm of All Sparks by allowing Optimus Primal to fire the Requiem Blaster on him.

And after Megatron's departure, Optimus Prime's Spark was unplugged from the Well, allowing him to return to function. The Matrix of Leadership remained in Optimal's possession, however, enabling him to lead the Maximals in a fight against the Predacons (Beast Wars) in the distant future.

Transformers Film Series

The character appears as the main antagonist of the series' second live action film, Transformers: Revenge of the Fallen, the 2009 sequel to the 2007 Transformers movie. Director Michael Bay described him as "apocalyptic". The Fallen has the ability to teleport and generate a shockwave upon reappearance. He is also armed with a void scepter, and has telekinesis. In the script of Transformers: Revenge of the Fallen, The Fallen is stated to be 50 tons.

IDW Publishing
In Transformers: Defiance, the artifact containing the Fallen is unearthed when Cybertron comes under attack by aliens that desire the AllSpark. During the fight, Megatron is gravely injured as the Fallen awakens from his rest, healing Megatron while taking him under his wing with promises of power. Under the guidance of the Fallen, Megatron reforms the Decepticons and plunges Cybertron into Civil War. In the prose story Transformers: Convergence, it is revealed that Fallen freed himself from his prison after Soundwave presented him with Sentinel Prime's space-bridge pillars, explaining how he got freed before the events of Revenge of the Fallen happened.

Role in the film

As a result, the Fallen became the first Decepticon and the true founder and leader of the Decepticons (as Megatron accepts the Fallen as his master), and all future Decepticons would wear an insignia which is similar to the Fallen's face.

In the present day, the Fallen appears after millennia and resumes leadership of the Decepticons. As he was weakened in the fight against the other Primes, he has spent all this time stuck on his ship on a planet far from Earth, draining energy from the Cybertronian protoforms on the ship to regain his strength. The Fallen reveals to the revived Megatron that the knowledge from the AllSpark they seek so they can find the Matrix is now in Sam Witwicky. This makes Sam the key to another source of Energon, gained from the Fallen's Sun Harvester, and the Fallen commands Megatron to find Sam. He also reveals he can only be defeated by a descendant of the Primes, with the last survivor of these descendants killed by Megatron. Now confident of no threats to him, the Fallen himself travels to Earth to complete his plans to destroy humanity, demanding the humans to turn over Sam to him otherwise the Decepticons will kill them all. Because of this, Sam is branded a fugitive by the world. Later, the Fallen, along with Megatron and the Decepticons, travel to the Great Pyramids of Giza, where the Fallen's Sun Harvester lies beneath one of the pyramids. There, seconds after Optimus Prime has been resurrected by Sam, the Fallen easily knocks a weakened Optimus down, steals the Matrix of Leadership from his body and teleports to the Sun Harvester. With Optimus too weak to battle him alone, the Fallen uses the Matrix to activate the Sun Harvester, and none of the human forces are able to stop the Fallen. However, Optimus receives parts from Jetfire, making him super-powerful, arrives on the scene and promptly disables the Sun Harvester beyond repair while knocking the Fallen and Megatron off of the pyramid. The Fallen and Optimus Prime then engage in a fierce duel. Megatron tries to help his master, but is quickly overpowered and blasted out of the fight by Optimus. After an exchange of multiple blows, the Fallen finally gets the upper hand and counterattacks Optimus, knocking away his sword and ripping off one of his rocket thrusters before attacking Optimus with his scepter, but Optimus is quick to viciously retaliate, breaking the weapon by using it to tear off the Fallen's face, thus revealing his skull. Realizing he is losing, the Fallen tries to get away and escape, but Optimus punches through his chest and crushes his spark core, finally killing him. Seeing his master dead, a wounded but resilient Megatron takes his position back as leader of the Decepticons, fleeing with Starscream.

Video games
The Fallen (voiced by James Arnold Taylor) appears in the official game adaptation of the film. He is not a playable character, but is the final boss of both campaigns, except in the Nintendo DS versions where the final boss is Optimus Prime or Megatron.

Aligned continuity

Megatronus is one of the Thirteen Primes in Transformers: Prime and Transformers: Robots in Disguise. He is called "The Fallen" at times, but never addressed as such when he actually appears. This version of Megatronus bears a striking resemblance to Generation 1 Galvatron and transforms into a tank that resembles the tank mode of Shockwave's alternate mode from Transformers Animated. Though the exact origins with the Decepticons are unclear, he is called the "first Decepticon" and bears a Decepticon insignia, a possible nod to Transformers: Revenge of the Fallen. Plates surrounding his face can become a mask that obscures/protects his facial features, and in addition to sporting arm cannons he wields a powerful spear and possesses supernatural abilities such as telekinesis.

Books
Megatronus Prime is mentioned as one of the original thirteen Primes in the 2010 book Transformers: Exodus. Megatron is shown originally calling himself "Megatronus" after this particular Prime, and is a gladiator, who then takes the name "Megatron" after the name is shortened by cheering fans at one of his matches. Megatronus, though the namesake of the Decepticon leader Megatron in the book, holds no sway over Megatron, who took the name simply because he had none of his own and wished to be associated with power and grandeur.

According to Transformers: Exiles, Megatronus Prime commissioned Solus Prime to create the Requiem Blaster. Later, Megatronus murdered Solus, triggering the first breaking among the Thirteen and leading him to become the Fallen.

Transformers: The Covenant of Primus reveals that Megatronus and Solus Prime were in love, but that Megatronus was prone to bursts of temper and aggression due to his pride and secret shame at being a necessary counter-force to balance out light and darkness within the Thirteen. Following the War of the Primes, he exiled himself from Cybertron after unintentionally murdering Solus Prime.

Animated series
In the 2010-2013 animated series Transformers: Prime, Megatron named himself after this particular Prime. He is briefly mentioned in the episode "Partners", when Starscream tells the Autobots he wishes to join them, Bulkhead jokes by saying that he's been "lobbing with The Fallen". In the episode "One Shall Rise, Part 1", the Thirteen were mentioned as the ones who vanquished Unicron. It is unclear, however, which of the Thirteen depicted in the flashback scene was the Fallen, due to the animation. In "One Shall Rise, Part 3", it was said by Ratchet that Megatron named himself after the Fallen's original name: "Megatronus".

In the 2015 sequel series, Transformers: Robots in Disguise, Megatronus, one of the original Thirteen Primes, is revealed to have been exiled to another dimension after murdering Solus Prime of which he blames both the Earth and Cybertron for. From within his prison dimension, Megatronus observed the Great War between the Autobots and Decepticons, raging from Cybertron, across the galaxy and eventually to the battles both groups' respective leaders, Optimus Prime and Megatron, personally led and fought against each other on Earth. Impressed and honored by Megatron's respect of his name, he christened himself as the first Decepticon, in order to inspire future generations he had foreseen.

In the present day, years after the Decepticons defeat, Megatronus plans to destroy Earth and Cybertron. Though trapped in his prison dimension he can still physically influence, and communicate with beings in, the prime dimension. Thus, he causes the crash of the Autobot Alchemor ship and releasing its Decepticon criminals, eventually making contact with a pack led by Steeljaw. Megatronus propositions a slightly unwilling Steeljaw into creating a GroundBridge to release him from his prison and in exchange would ensure that Earth will become his to rule. Through Steeljaw's pack's efforts, Megatronus arrives on Earth on Crown City's Liberty Island. There he subsequently engages Optimus Prime and the other Autobots, and reveals he has been granted enhanced abilities by an unknown source. Obtaining a requested Spark-fuser from Steeljaw, Megatronus announces his intention to the Decepticons to use it to summon what remains of Unicron's anti-spark from Earth's core, and the AllSpark from Cybertron, and merge them resulting in both planets' dying.

Steeljaw becomes furious and tries to attack Megatronus only to be swiftly defeated. Megatronus nearly succeeds in his plan, but Optimus cuts away the part of the scepter with the anti-spark, just before the Allspark enters it and cause to the Sparks to merge, with a throw of his weapon. This causes the two Sparks to return to their respective points of origin, and a now-enraged Megatronus lashes out at the Autobots. During this showdown, the Autobots follow a plan from Bumblebee, with Optimus and Grimlock attacking him to force him into a spot where Liberty Island statue's arm, cut off by Windblade, Sideswipe and Drift, lands on him. As Megatronus tries to get out from under it, Bumblebee, Strongarm and Sideswipe use their combined Decepticon Hunters to emit a blastwave large enough to vaporize him. However, Bumblebee still questions if he is not dead.

The animated series seems to alter Megatronus' pre-established history, removing the redeeming and tragic qualities that Transformers: Exodus had established (such as his relationship and love for Solus Prime, and his self-doubt and depression at being a dark "counter" to Prima's light) rather modeling him more in line with his film counterpart, being a cold and brutal tyrant who harbors a hatred against Earth, his murder of Solus Prime apparently fully intentional, and thinking of himself as "the First Decepticon" despite having no known connection to the group's founding or his namesake. Although this could be a result of his long imprisonment having driven him insane and embittered him into his current villainous state.

Video games
Megatronus appears as an unlockable character in the mobile game for Transformers: Robots in Disguise.

Toys
The first toy version of the Fallen was released in 2007 as a part of the Transformers: Titanium toy line as a 6" transforming figure. The Fallen would receive several toys for the toy line accompanying Transformers: Revenge of the Fallen, in which the toys were a new mold that transformed from robot to Cybertronian Destroyer mode, despite not having been depicted with an alternate mode in the film. Most prominently, he would receive a voyager class toy which first appeared on the internet in February 2009. This toy was designed by Takara Tomy toy designer Hisashi Yuki. With the Fallen standing 1280 centimeters (42 feet) tall, and this toy standing 20 centimeters tall in robot mode, this makes the toy about 1:64 scale.

A Toys "R" Us exclusive gift set included the Voyager Fallen figure with a gray redeco of Voyager Megatron (2007 version) and a blue/gray redeco of Deluxe Soundwave. In 2010, he would receive a voyager class toy with a light blue/teal redeco with spear and an all-new head sculpt with a removable face to depict when he is decapicitated by Optimus. The figure is retooled with new hands and grooves on the upper torso to hold the spear. Hasbro has stated in an interview that the light blue was to balance the darker blue of the main body.

Megatronus would receive a number of toys in the toy line accompanying the 2015 Transformers: Robots in Disguise television series. Packaged with Optimus Prime, the first Megatronus toy is a smaller Legion-sized mold which can transform from a tank to robot and back. The second toy, 5-Step Changer Megatronus, transforms from robot to tank and back in five steps and is released in an open package, which allows children to touch the toy. His scannable Decepticon insignia is on his robot mode chest/vehicle mode front. As with all Robots in Disguise figures, he has a scannable Decepticon insignia, which scanning in the Robots in Disguise mobile game temporarily unlocks the character if the player has not permanently unlocked it already. The badge is easily scannable while in package. Also made was a "Warrior Class" figure of Megatronus (the renaming of the Deluxe class for Robots In Disguise) that came in two variants: one exclusive to Toys R Us worldwide with his faceplate down, and a mass release version with the faceplate up. Both versions come with his spear-like scepter.

References

External links
 The Fallen at the Transformers Wiki
 The Fallen War Within Titanium Action Figure

Comics characters who use magic
Transformers characters
Extraterrestrial supervillains
Science fiction film characters
Galactic emperors
Fictional mass murderers
Robot characters in video games
Video game bosses
Comics characters introduced in 2003
Fictional characters who can teleport
Fictional characters with superhuman strength
Fictional telekinetics
Male characters in comics
Male supervillains